Ivan Dorovský (18 May 1935 – 24 August 2021) was a Czech Balkanologist of Macedonian origin. He worked as a literary scholar, translator, poet and publicist, university professor at Masaryk University, and Slavist. He was also the Chairman of the Society of Friends of the South Slavs. He was the 2008 recipient of the Macedonian honorary Racin Recognition for his contribution and affirmation of Macedonian literature and culture, and the 2013 recipient of the F. A. Zach Prize for his contribution to the relationship with the Serbian nation.

He left Greece as a child during the civil war.

Life 
He studied Russian and Bulgarian at the Faculty of Arts of Masaryk University in Brno. After graduation he worked briefly as a high school professor, then from 1961 lectured at the University of Brno and in 1987 he was appointed full professor. His scientific and artistic activities spanned several fields: literary science, linguistics, ethnography and folklore studies, history, and cultural studies. He was an elected member (14 May 1979) of the Macedonian Academy of Sciences and Arts in Skopje. He regularly organized and led Balkanology symposia at the Masaryk University in Brno. He was also named (2000) honorary professor at Ss. Cyril and Methodius University of Skopje.

Work 
He was the author of many monographs and dictionaries. He compiled medallions of Macedonian, Serbian, Slovenian, Croatian, Bulgarian, Albanian and other authors. His bibliography of over 2000 items included his scientific, journalistic and artistic works, not only citations themselves, but also some reviews of publications. He was interested in Balkan and Slavic studies, especially in the history of literature, folklore, ethnography and languages of the Balkan Slavic and non-Slavic peoples, and his research extended to Russian studies as well. In 2014, he published a memoir entitled With Home in My Heart.

Selected publications: 

 České země a Balkán: kapitoly z dějin česko-makedonských a makedonsko-českých styků. 1973
 Konstantin Jireček – život a dílo. 1983
 Rajko Žinzifov: vozdejstvije russkoj i ukrainskoj literatury na jego tvorčestvo. 1988
 Studii za balkanskiot literaturen proces vo 19 i 20 vek. 1992
 Dramatické umění jižních Slovanů. 1 (1918–1941). 1995
 Ivan Dorovský: Bibliografie 1995
 Charváti ještě žijí mezi námi. 1996
 Česko-charvátský slovník. 1996
 Balkán a Mediterán : Literárně historické a teoretické studie. 1997
 Makedonci žijí mezi námi. 1998
 Studie z literárněvědné slavistiky. 1999
 Slovník balkánských spisovatelů. 2001
 Studia slavica et balkanica. 2001
 Mickiewicz, Puškin a Balkán. 2001
 Ilinden je v nás. Ilinden e vo nas. To Ilinten ine mesa mas. Ilinden is within us. 2003
 Vozdejstvoto na ruskata i ukrainskata literatura vrz tvoreštvoto na Rajko Žiznifov. 2003
 Recepce literatury jižních Slovanů u nás. 2004
 With Home in My Heart. 2014
 Studia Macedonica II. 2015

See also 
 Balkan studies
 Slavic studies

References

External links 
 

1935 births
2021 deaths
20th-century Czech historians
20th-century linguists
21st-century Czech historians
Slavists
Linguists from the Czech Republic
Czech people of Macedonian descent
Balkan studies